The 1996 NCAA Division I Women's Lacrosse Championship was the 15th annual single-elimination tournament to determine the national champion of Division I NCAA women's college lacrosse. The championship game was played at Goodman Stadium in Bethlehem, Pennsylvania during May 1996.  All NCAA Division I women's lacrosse programs were eligible for this championship; a total of 6 teams were invited to participate.

Maryland defeated Virginia, 10–5, to win their fourth, and second consecutive, national championship. This would subsequently become the second of Maryland's record seven straight national titles (1995–2001). Furthermore, Maryland's championship win secured its second straight undefeated season (19–0).

The leading scorer for the tournament, with 7 goals, was Kelly Amonte from Maryland. The Most Outstanding Player trophy was not awarded this year.

Teams

Tournament bracket

Tournament outstanding players 
Kerri Johnson, Loyola (MD)
Kelly Amonte, Maryland
Sarah Forbes, Maryland
Karen MacCrate, Maryland
Sascha Newmarch, Maryland
Tami Riley, Maryland
Erin O'Neill, Princeton
Lisa Rebane, Princeton
Cristi Samaras, Princeton
Kara Ariza, Virginia
Peggy Boutilier, Virginia
Michelle Cusimano, Virginia

See also 
 NCAA Division I Women's Lacrosse Championship
 NCAA Division III Women's Lacrosse Championship
 1996 NCAA Division I Men's Lacrosse Championship

References

NCAA Division I Women's Lacrosse Championship
NCAA Division I Women's Lacrosse Championship
NCAA Women's Lacrosse Championship